The 1917 Argentine Primera División was the 26th season of top-flight football in Argentina. The season began on April 1, and ended on December 30.

Racing won its fifth consecutive league title. Sportivo Barracas made its debut in Primera División, while Gimnasia y Esgrima (BA) and Banfield were relegated at the end of the season.

Final table

References

Argentine Primera División seasons
1917 in Argentine football
1917 in South American football